De Witt Island, also known as Big Witch, is an island located close to the south-western coast of Tasmania, Australia. The  island is the largest of the Maatsuyker Islands Group, and comprises part of the Southwest National Park and the Tasmanian Wilderness World Heritage Site. The island is listed on the Australian Register of the National Estate.

Location and features
Abel Tasman discovered it in 1642 and named it Witsen or Wits Eijlanden. The highest parts of the island are located very close to the south coast, and enclose a north-facing basin. The island's  summit is located very close
to its southernmost point. Although currently uninhabited, it has a long history of human usage, including logging and occasional habitation. The island is part of the Maatsuyker Island Group Important Bird Area, identified as such by BirdLife International because of its importance as a breeding site for seabirds.

The island is extensively forested with the principal species being Eucalyptus nitida, swamp gum and messmate.  Sheltered areas also have leatherwood and myrtle beech.

Recorded breeding seabird and wader species are the little penguin (500 pairs), short-tailed shearwater (11,000 pairs), fairy prion (50 pairs), silver gull and sooty oystercatcher. Swift parrots have been recorded. Mammals present include the Tasmanian pademelon, long-nosed potoroo and swamp rat. Reptiles recorded are the metallic skink and Tasmanian tree skink.

See also

 South East Cape
 South West Cape
 List of islands of Tasmania

References

Islands of Tasmania
Protected areas of Tasmania
South West Tasmania
Important Bird Areas of Tasmania
Islands of Australia (Tenure: State Reserve)
Maritime history of the Dutch East India Company